THine Electronics Incorporated is a Japanese fabless LSI maker that provides mixed signal LSI and analog technologies, headquartered in Tokyo, Japan. THine Electronics also has subsidiaries in Seoul, Korea and Taipei, Taiwan. Some of THine’s products have the most market shares in the world because of technical advantages. Its technologies include high-speed interfaces such as V-by-One HS, LVDS, timing controller, analog-to-digital converter (ADC), image signal processor (ISP), and power management in smart phone, tablets, flat screen televisions, LCD monitors, projectors, document processing, amusement, security systems, and automotive markets.

History

Start-up in Tsukuba
THine was founded in Tsukuba, Japan, in 1991 by Dr. Tetsuya Iizuka as THine Microsystems. The name “THine” is after the Old English word “thine” that means “yours”. The capitalization stands for "Targeting High" and "Talented Human".

In 1992 THine Microsystems and Samsung Electronics Corporation established their joint venture, THine Electronics, Inc. in Tokyo, Japan as a research institute of advanced memories and high-speed interface technologies. After 6 years collaboration in research and development, THine Electronics had completed its management buy-out from Samsung Electronics Corporation in 1998 and started its own branded fabless LSI business in the area of high-speed serial interface for growing display and image data transmission markets.

Starting fabless business model
In 1998, THine Electronics started mass production of digital signal processing chips in flat panel display markets for companies worldwide. In the same year THine Electronics acquired all outstanding stocks of THine Microsystems　(merged to THine Electronics in 2000) and completed its business model as fabless LSI maker. Overcoming the many challenges of establishing a start-up venture in Japan, Dr. Iizuka has developed breakthrough solutions for low-cost and compact video-signal handling. THine Electronics established its Taiwan subsidiary, THine Electronics Taiwan, Inc. to control manufacturing and reinforce overseas marketing functions including the Taiwan markets.

Development of advanced technologies and IPO
In 2001 THine’s analog-to-digital converter product won the award for excellence in the LSI Design of the Year 2001. THine also established its own high-speed testing facilities in its research site and accelerate its developing activities.
THine Electronics made initial public offering and listed its stocks in JASDAQ Securities Exchange, Japanese growth security market in 2001.

THine has accumulated its analog and digital intellectual properties and expand its technical portfolio in the wade area in high-speed serial interface of V-by-One HS, LVDS, and CalDriCon, image signal processor (ISP), analog-to-digital converter, timing controller, power management, LED driver, motor driver, and related mixed signal technologies.

Alliance and acquisitions
THine Electronics emphasized alliance is one of the most important strategies. In its early history, THine collaborated with Samsung Electronics Corp., established Topshine Electronics Corp. as a joint venture of THine Microsystems. In addition, just before THine’s IPO, Hitachi and NEC made their symbolic investments in THine as partners.
 
Dr. Iizuka founded the Japan Semiconductor Venture Association (JASVA) to improve opportunities for entrepreneurs in Japan in 2000.

In 2002, THine acquired Giga Technologies, Inc., a radio frequency technical team, and also acquired a power management LSI team in the same year.

In 2006, THine structured “Enova” venture capital fund, focusing on electronics industry companies with Ant Capital Partners and Chip One Stop, Inc. to cultivate Japanese entrepreneurship in electronics industry.

In 2009, THine acquired an image signal processing team from Winbond Electronics, Corp. and launched its own ISP products with fewer footprints, less power consumption, high-speed frame rate, and high resolution such as 13 mega-pixels.

In 2011, THine invested in Dazzo Technology Corp., a Taiwanese fabless LSI maker, to cultivate new alliance opportunities.

Tack to Asia
THine has maintained long-term relationship with Asian partners. 

In addition to its Taiwanese subsidiary, THine Electronics Taiwan, established in 2000, THine also established THine Electronics Korea, Inc. as its subsidiary in Seoul, Korea, in 2010. In 2010s, THine reinforced the Asian operation to expand its customers.

De facto standard
The technology pioneered by Dr. Iizuka has fueled the success of digital video devices including laptops, tablets, and 3D televisions. Under Dr. Iizuka’s guidance, THine advanced existing low-voltage differential signaling (LVDS) technology to introduce 10-bit LVDS in 2003. The 10-bit LVDS chip as a television’s internal interface supports 1 billion colors compared to 8-bit LVDS’ 16 million colors and was widely accepted as the new value for image quality in television displays.
 
THine also developed the V-by-One HS chip. Considered the next-generation interface for flat-panel displays, this technology can realize high-definition television through eight pairs of internal video interface cables compared to the 48 pairs required with LVDS. V-by-One HS technology can be applied widely to automotives, security systems, document processing, flat panel displays, robotics and amusement markets.

See also
 V-by-One HS
 CalDriCon

References

 The 2012 IEEE Awards Booklet “Field of Vision” (page 4), June 30, 2012
 “A rere spark in Japan’s electronics industry,” Financial Times July 13, 2005
 “Japan Ventures take stock,” EETimes January 10, 2005
 “The term “Japanese entrepreneur” use to be an oxymoron, but some technology executives are helping to change that image” Electronics Supply & Manufacturing, June 2004
 THine Electronics ships more than10 million V-by-One® Chips
 THine’s low-power LVDS transmitters selected by NVIDIA for Tegra 3 platform
 THine discloses an advanced high-speed LCD driver interface, CalDriCon®, at SID
 LG Electronics selects THine’s V-by-One®HS as the next interface for DTV
 MediaTek selects V-by-One® HS standard as an advanced interface for its highly integrated TV controller SOC family
 Samsung selects THine’s V-by-One® HS as the next generation interface for high-end LCD panels
 THine releases an advanced Ser/Des chipset for network camera markets (V-by-One® reduces number of cables by 90% and extends transmission of digital pixel data up to 10m)

Fabless semiconductor companies
Semiconductor companies of Japan
Electronics companies established in 1991